This article is the discography of Italian popera trio Il Volo and includes all the studio albums, live albums, EPs, and singles, as well as the peak chart positions for Italy, Argentina, Austria, Belgium (Wallonia), France, Germany, Mexico, Netherlands, New Zealand, Switzerland and United States (Billboard 200, Classical Albums, Top Latin Albums and Latin Pop Albums for the albums and Classical Digital Songs and World Digital Songs for the singles). Furthermore, there are certifications from FIMI, CAPIF, IFPI Austria, SNEP, AMPROFON, RMNZ and the RIAA.

Albums

Studio albums

Original versions

Re-issues charted separately

Spanish versions

Live albums

Compilation albums

Extended plays

Singles

Italian-language singles

Spanish-language singles

Other charted songs

Other appearances

Music videos

Notes

 A^ Ámame was released only in United States and Latin America. It peaked at no. 12 on Latin Album Sales in USA.
 B^ The CAPIF certification for Más Que Amor also includes the sales of the original version, We Are Love.

References

Discographies of Italian artists
Pop music discographies
Latin pop music discographies